The Everything for the Country Party (PTT) was a political party in Romania. Founded in 1993 by former members of the fascist Iron Guard, the party claimed to adhere to a "national-Christian" doctrine and styled itself as the successor to the interwar party of the same name. It was banned in 2015.

The PTT appeared as a feedback to the continuity and consolidation of the system structures before 1989, the development of the corrupt and immoral politicians, and the founders believing that the last have threatened the existence of the Romanian nation and the Romanian unitary national state, threatening Romania with the isolation from the civilized world. Under these circumstances, the old fighters considered that the National Resistance should continue, but under the conditions and frameworks provided by the rule of law. The PTT worships the legionnaires Corneliu Zelea Codreanu, Horia Sima or Radu Gyr, as it appears from the publication "Buciumul".

Ideology
The Everything For the Country Party relies on the national-Christian doctrine values, standing at the right of the Romanian political scene. The basic principles and values of the PTT are discipline, moral order, national and Christian values, and the rule of law. 

The founders of the party have repeatedly stated that this party is the only political force that legitimately pursues the spirit of the National Anticommunist Resistance.

Headquarters
In the media around 2000, the PTT became the only party in Romania whose members built, exclusively by their own money and work, their central headquarters on land donated by a member, who was the former political prisoner (Freedom, September 1999).

Leadership
 President: Virgil Totoescu (Suceava) - teacher, participant at the National Anticommunist Resistance, former political prisoner from 1948 to 1964. Responsible for the Moldova region.
 Executive President: Cătălin Maghiar (Galați) - PhD Professor, degree in History.
 Vice President (Bucharest Metropolitan Area): Corneliu Suliman (Bucharest) - participant at the National Anticommunist Resistance, former political prisoner, constructor, entrepreneur.
 Vice-president (Transylvania-Banat area): C. Baciu - lawyer, economist, PhD in law.
 Vice-president (South area): Răzvan A. (Bucharest) - engineer.
 Secretary-General: Florin Dobrescu (Bucharest) - professor, degree in geography.

Prominent members
Another occasion when the PPP made visible is the membership of some well-known Romanian personalities such as: Ion Gavrilă Ogoranu, the leader of the Anticommunist Armed Resistance in the Făgăraș Mountains (vice president and then, the lifelong president of PPP), the actor Ernest Maftei who was a political prisoner, Mircea Nicolau, president of the "Prof. George Manu " foundation- involved at the peak of Anti-Communist Resistance and political prisoner for 20 years, Nicolae Purcarea, popular artist (wooden sculptor), prof. PhD. Ion Brad (a biochemist known as the sea buckthorn father), Confessor Constantin Voicescu, a former political prisoner and one of the top of the University Square of 1990, Confessor Dumitru Balaşa, nicknamed the "Patriarch of Valcea", a famous historian of the Dacians period, etc.

References

Anti-communism in Romania
Anti-communist organizations
Eastern Orthodox political parties
Fascist parties in Romania
Iron Guard
Nationalist parties in Romania
Neo-fascist parties
Non-registered political parties in Romania
Political parties established in 1993
Eastern Orthodoxy and far-right politics
Romanian nationalist parties
Banned far-right parties